TuS Mechtersheim are a German association football club based in Mechtersheim.

History
TuS Mechtersheim was founded on 1 March 1914 as Viktoria Mechtersheim. Following the conclusion of World War I the club was remade as Sportverein Mechtersheim. With the formation of an athletics department in 1930 came the adoption of the name Turn- und Sportverein Mechtersheim. In the aftermath of World War II organizations across the country, including sports and football clubs, were ordered dissolved by occupying Allied authorities. The club was re-established as ASV Mechtersheim in 1946, before resuming its old identity as Tus Mechtersheim in March 1950.

TuS played through most of its history at the amateur level. The team won promotion to the Landesliga Südwest-Ost (VI) in 2001 before advancing through the Verbandsliga Südwest (V) to the Oberliga Südwest (IV) in 2004.

For the next eleven seasons the club played in the Oberliga, with a seventh place in 2013 as its best result. A fourteenth place in 2014–15 however meant relegation to the Verbandsliga for Mechtersheim where it won another league title in 2015–16 and returned to the Oberliga.

Honours
The club's honours:
 Verbandsliga Südwest (V)
 Champions: 2004, 2016
 Landesliga Südwest-Ost
 Champions: 2001
 A-Klasse Speyer
 Champions: 1980, 1986
 B-Klasse Speyer
 Champions: 1968, 1977

Recent seasons
The recent season-by-season performance of the club:

With the introduction of the Regionalligas in 1994 and the 3. Liga in 2008 as the new third tier, below the 2. Bundesliga, all leagues below dropped one tier. In 2012 the Oberliga Südwest was renamed Oberliga Rheinland-Pfalz/Saar.

References

External links
 Official team site
 TuS Mechtersheim at Weltfussball.de
 Das deutsche Fußball-Archiv historical German domestic league tables 

Football clubs in Germany
Football clubs in Rhineland-Palatinate
Association football clubs established in 1914
1914 establishments in Germany